Gur-e Khar or Gur Khar or Gur-i-Khar may refer to:
 Gur-e Khar, Fars
 Gur Khar, Khuzestan
 Gurkhar